It's a Living is a Canadian reality television series broadcast on CBC Television.  In the series, Peter Jordan, the host, tries all sorts of jobs, from the mundane to the unusual, that belong to different Canadians. It's a Living was produced by CBWT in Winnipeg, Manitoba.

Jordan won 2 Gemini Awards for Best Host in 1998 and 2000. The show was cancelled in October 2003.

 It’s A Living – Season 13, Episode 12 - “Peter Pan, Senses” featured famed children’s entertainer Fred Penner (Captain Hook) sword fighting actor Derek Aasland (Peter Pan) in a unique flying machine.

See also
List of TV and Films shot in Winnipeg

Referenced

External links

1989 Canadian television series debuts
2004 Canadian television series endings
1980s Canadian reality television series
1990s Canadian reality television series
2000s Canadian reality television series
CBC Television original programming
English-language television shows
Television shows filmed in Winnipeg